North Foreland (TR 39860 69616 )  and South Foreland (TR 35909 43307 ) are two chalk headlands on the Kent coast of southeast England.

See:
North Foreland
South Foreland

Headlands of Kent